Ashley Kaltwasser is an American IFBB Pro fitness and figure competitor (bikini division) and fitness model. She is the winner of the Bikini Olympia contest in 2013, 2014 and 2015. As of 2022, she has won 37 professional bodybuilding titles, more than any other competitor in history.

Career
Kaltwasser is a former track and field athlete, competing in the indoor pentathlon,. She was ALL-STATE in both sports, running cross country solely to stay in shape for track. While competing at Coventry, Ashley broke over 7 track and cross country records, all of which still stand. Ashley was awarded a track scholarship to a Division I college, where her main event was the 400 meter hurdles. She started training for fitness and figure competition in 2011 when her former high school coach introduced her to the sport. She participated in the 2011 NPC Natural Northern USA Championships and claimed the first place. Her first professional event was 2012 Houston Pro where she had the 5th place and she became the winner of the Toronto Pro Supershow Bikini Division in 2013. At the 2013 Joe Weider's Olympia Fitness & Performance Weekend Bikini Olympia competition, defeating the former winner Nathalia Melo.

References

External links
Ashley Kaltwasser Official Website

1988 births
Living people
Fitness and figure competitors
Sportspeople from Akron, Ohio
American female bodybuilders
21st-century American women